Christopher John Eitzmann (April 1, 1977 – December 29, 2021) was an American football tight end. He played college football at Harvard and three seasons in the NFL for the New England Patriots and two seasons for the Cleveland Browns.

Early life and college career
Born in Belleville, Kansas, Eitzmann grew up on a farm in Hardy, Nebraska. Eitzmann graduated from Chester-Hubbell-Byron High School, a school with only 50 students where he played on an eight-man football team in addition to basketball and track.

Eitzmann attended Harvard University after high school and played at tight end for the Harvard Crimson from 1995 to 1999, sitting out the 1996 season due to injury. At Harvard, Eitzmann had 45 receptions for 572 yards and eight touchdowns and was a first-team All-Ivy League and first-team Successful Farming farm All-American honoree as a senior in 1999. Eitzmann withdrew from Harvard for the spring 1997 semester to work at the trading desk of Hellman, Jordan Management in Boston. Eitzmann graduated from Harvard in 2000 with a degree in psychology.

Pro football career
After going undrafted in the 2000 NFL Draft, Eitzmann signed with the New England Patriots as a free agent on April 19, 2000. He was waived on August 27 but signed with the Green Bay Packers the next day. Eitzmann then signed with the Patriots practice squad on September 6, one day after being waived from the Packers. Eitzmann then signed with the Patriots active roster on October 21 and appeared in five games with one start before being placed on injured reserve on December 1.

Following the preseason, the Patriots released Eitzmann on September 2, 2001. Eitzmann then signed with the Cleveland Browns practice squad on December 4, 2001. He was then allocated to the Frankfurt Galaxy of NFL Europe in 2002. With the Galaxy, Eitzmann played in seven games with five starts, with seven receptions for 64 yards. The Browns waived Eitzmann on September 1, 2002.

Post-football career
Eitzmann moved to Lincoln, Nebraska and became a financial advisor after retiring from football. In 2007, he completed his M.B.A. at the Tuck School of Business at Dartmouth College.

Eitzmann was found dead of alcohol poisoning in December 2021 at age 44. He had been suffering from CTE in the last years of his life.

References

External links
NFL.com profile

1977 births
2021 deaths
American football tight ends
Harvard Crimson football players
New England Patriots players
Cleveland Browns players
Frankfurt Galaxy players
People from Nuckolls County, Nebraska
Players of American football from Nebraska
People from Belleville, Kansas
Players of American football from Kansas
Tuck School of Business alumni